Fahrudin Mustafić (also known as Mustafic Fahrudin, born 17 April 1981) is a retired Singaporean professional footballer who spent most of his playing career as a centre-back for S-League side Tampines Rovers FC and retired at the end of the 2018 season. Born in Serbia, he represented the Singapore national team. He also has a Bosnian citizenship.

Football career

Club career 
Born in Novi Pazar, SR Serbia, SFR Yugoslavia, Fahrudin started playing in the youth team of FK Novi Pazar when he was 10. He played in the youth teams until 2000, when he joined the senior squad and spent two seasons in the Second League of FR Yugoslavia.

In January 2002, Fahrudin was brought to Singapore with the help of fellow Serbian and Tampines Rovers player, Sead Muratović. Impressive displays in his first two seasons earned him citizenship.

Fahrudin, or Farra as he is affectionately known by fans of the Tampines Rovers and the national team.

Known as a tenacious player, Fahrudin became a pivotal member of the national set-up with his crisp passing and tight marking ability. He is also proficient in taking penalties and was the first-choice penalty taker for both club and country.

In September 2009, Fahrudin went to Indonesia to play for Persija Jakarta. Following his release by Persija, he joined Persela Lamongan. He returned to the Tampines Rovers in June 2011.

At the end of the 2018 Singapore Premier League, Fahrudin announced his retirement from professional football, having played more than 300 official games for Tampines Rovers.

International career 
Fahrudin made his debut for the national team in a friendly against Denmark in January 2006.

Fahrudin was also part of the national side that took part at the 2007 AFF Championship, where he played a key role in helping Singapore retain their title. He scored his first goal for Singapore in the final through a controversial penalty against Thailand at the National Stadium.

Personal life 
In 2005, Fahrudin became a Singaporean citizen under the Foreign Sports Talent Scheme.

National team career statistics

Goals for senior national team

Honours

Club
Tampines Rovers
S.League (2): 2004, 2005
Singapore Cup (2): 2004, 2006
Singapore
AFF Championship: 2007, 2012

Individual
 ASEAN Football Federation Best XI: 2013

References

External links

 
Fahrudin Join Persija
https://web.archive.org/web/20131013033232/http://www.goal.com/en-sg/match/98590/singapore-vs-thailand/report

1981 births
Living people
Sportspeople from Novi Pazar
Singaporean footballers
Singapore international footballers
Serbian footballers
Serbian emigrants to Singapore
Singaporean people of Bosniak descent
Singaporean people of Serbian descent
Bosniaks of Serbia
FK Novi Pazar players
Tampines Rovers FC players
Expatriate footballers in Indonesia
Liga 1 (Indonesia) players
Persela Lamongan players
Expatriate footballers in Singapore
Naturalised citizens of Singapore
Singapore Premier League players
Association football midfielders
Hougang United FC players